John B. Williams may refer to:
 John B. Williams (disc jockey) or John B (born 1977), English disc jockey
 John B. Williams Jr. (born 1941), American bassist
 John Beaumont Williams (1932–2005), Australian botanist
 John Bell Williams (1918–1983), American politician
 John Benson Williams or Ian Rotten (born 1970), American wrestler
 John Brodie Williams or Johnnie Williams (1889–1963), American baseball player
 John Burr Williams (1900–1989), American economist
 John B. Williams (general), United States Air Force general
 Sir John Bickerton Williams, English nonconformist author and lawyer

See also 
 John Williams (disambiguation)